Kerang East is a locality situated in Victoria, Australia. At the 2016 census, Kerang East had a population of 40.

References

Towns in Victoria (Australia)